99Vidas (Portuguese for "99 Lives") is a retro-styled side-scrolling beat 'em up video game developed and published by Brazilian studio QuByte Interactive. It was first released for Microsoft Windows, macOS, and Linux in late 2016, followed by PlayStation 3, PlayStation 4 and PlayStation Vita in 2017. A Nintendo Switch version was released in November 2018.

Gameplay 
99Vidas is a side-scrolling beat 'em up initially featuring six playable characters. Five more unlocked through multiple play sessions, bringing the total number of playable characters to 11. It features cooperative and competitive game modes, for up to four players, which can be played either locally or online.

Each character has unique attributes such as speed and strength, as well as an elemental alignment (fire, water, wind, lightning, et al.), which dictates the quality of their attacks, combos and special moves. Characters gain experience points by defeating enemies and collecting special items which can then be used by the player to upgrade their abilities and combos, or to unlock new ones.

The campaign and survival modes can be played solo or by up to four players cooperatively. In campaign mode, players progress through the story together, while in survival, they face unending waves of enemies, with a limited number of lives and ever-increasing difficulty, the objective being attaining high scores, which are posted to an arcade-style leaderboard. In versus mode, two to four players can play head-to-head competitive matches, where the last one standing wins.

Plot 
99Vidas is set in an anachronistic fictional universe inspired by 1980s and 1990s pop culture and video game aesthetic. The story starts as an artifact known as 99Vidas goes missing. This artifact is believed to hold such great power it is a menace to the very existence of the universe, should it ever fall into the wrong hands. Players play as "guardians" of 99Vidas, heroes with elemental powers whose duty it is to protect the artifact.

Development 
Development of the game started in early 2015 as a joint project by game studio QuByte Interactive and Brazilian gaming podcast 99Vidas, its namesake.  Producer Marivaldo Cabral told IGN Brazil that the idea was to make a beat 'em up game that blended classic mechanics and aesthetics of the genre with more modern gameplay elements. Stated influences and inspirations included late 1980s and 1990s titles such as Double Dragon, Final Fight, Golden Axe, and Streets of Rage.

A demo was developed, using Unity featuring hand-drawn sprites and sound samples to emulate a 16-bit look and feel. Following its free release, a campaign was set up on Brazilian crowdfunding website Catarse in July 2015. The game raised 127 thousand Brazilian reais over the following two months, surpassing its initial goal of R$80,000 for the development on PC. This enabled the development of console ports for PlayStation 4, PlayStation 3, PlayStation Vita and Xbox One.

The game was approved on Steam Greenlight in September 2015 and subsequently released on the Steam digital marketplace on December 22, 2016. On July 18, 2017, 99Vidas was released for PlayStation 4, PlayStation 3 and PlayStation Vita. A Nintendo Switch port was released on November 27, 2018.

Downloadable content 
99Vidas received downloadable content called "The Last Battle". It adds new levels, enemies and more. In total, 2 new levels, 3 new enemies and 15 image filters were added. The content is available for both single player and multiplayer game modes, both local and online, and was released only for the PlayStation 4.

References 

2016 video games
Arcade video games
Cooperative video games
Linux games
MacOS games
Nintendo Switch games
PlayStation Network games
PlayStation 4 games
PlayStation 3 games
PlayStation Vita games
Retro-style video games
Multiplayer and single-player video games
Side-scrolling beat 'em ups
Windows games
Steam Greenlight games
Video games developed in Brazil
Video games with cross-platform play
Xbox One games